Starla Brodie (April 22, 1955 – April 8, 2014) was a two-time World Series of Poker champion having won the 1979 Mixed Doubles - No Limit Hold'em (with Doyle Brunson) and the 1995 $1,000 Ladies - Limit 7 Card Stud event.

Her total WSOP tournament winnings total $57,030.

Brodie died in April 2014.

World Series of Poker bracelets

References

American poker players
World Series of Poker bracelet winners
Female poker players
1955 births
2014 deaths